The Cleek–McCabe site is a Middle Fort Ancient culture (1200 to 1400 CE) archaeological site near Walton in Boone County, Kentucky, in the northern Bluegrass region of the state. The site has several components, including two mounds and a village.

Site description

McCabe mound 15Be8
The McCabe mound was partially excavated in the 1930s by William S. Webb of the University of Kentucky, and consequently is one of the best documented Fort Ancient burial mounds to date. The fill used to construct the mound was sterile clay, midden deposits, and limestone slabs, and under the mound the WPA excavators found a pre-existing village midden. Because the mound fill and midden under it contained the same pottery debris, archaeologists believe the mound was constructed very quickly. Within the mound archaeologists found the remains of 21 individuals, most in a flexed or semi-flexed position, although a few were in an extended position. Underneath the mound were found the posthole remains of three structures. The earliest was a circular structure  in diameter. Superimposed over this were two rectangular buildings that are either the remains of one building nested inside the other or two chronologically different structures of different sizes. Within the structures were large circular hearths and a prepared floor area. Because of the size of the structures and the lack of everyday debris found near them it is assumed they were for special community activities or functioned as a charnel house.

Cleek mound 15Be23
It has never been excavated, so archaeologist are unsure if it contains burials like the other mound or if it is also superimposed over special use structures.

See also
 Ronald Watson Gravel site
 Hansen site
 Bentley site
 Thompson site
 Hardin Village site

References

External links
 The Ronald Watson Gravel Site (15Be249): An examination of the Late Woodland/Fort Ancient transition in Boone County, Kentucky

Fort Ancient culture
Archaeological sites in Kentucky
Buildings and structures in Boone County, Kentucky